A calvary, also called calvary hill, Sacred Mount, or Sacred Mountain, is a type of Christian sacred place, built on the slopes of a hill, composed by a set of chapels, usually laid out in the form of a pilgrims' way. It is intended to represent the passion of Jesus Christ and takes its name after Calvary, the hill in Jerusalem where, according to tradition, Jesus was crucified.

These function as greatly expanded versions of the Stations of the Cross that are usual in Catholic churches, allowing the devout to follow the progress of the stages of the Passion of Christ along the Via Dolorosa in Jerusalem. Each chapel contains a large image of the scene from the Passion it commemorates, sometimes in sculpture, that may be up to life-size.  This kind of shrine was especially popular in the Baroque period when the Holy Land was under Turkish rule and it was difficult to make a pilgrimage to the Mount Calvary in Jerusalem.

Calvaries were especially popular with the Franciscan and Jesuit orders, and are most common in Italy and Habsburg Central Europe. They were usually placed in parks near a church or a monastery, typically on a hill which the visitor gradually ascends. Italian ones are usually called a sacro monte ("holy mountain" or "hill"); there are a group of nine Sacri Monti of Piedmont and Lombardy that are especially notable; their dates of foundation vary between 1486 and 1712.  Devotions would be most popular in Passion Week, before Easter, when large processions around the stations would be held, and mystery plays might be acted.  If a calvary was established in an inhabited place, it might result in a location of a new village or town. Several villages and towns are named after such a complex.

Terminology 
The Mount of Calvary was the site outside the gates of Jerusalem where the crucifixion of Christ took place. The scene was replicated around the world in numerous "calvary hills" after the Counter-Reformation and they are used by Roman Catholics in particular as part of their worship and veneration of God.

The term is derived from the Latin translation in the Vulgate of the Aramaic name for original hill, Golgotha, where it was called 
calvariae locus, Latin for "the place of the skull". Martin Luther translated Golgatha as "skull place" (Scheddelstet). This translation is debated; at the very least it is not clear whether it referred to the shape of the hill, its use as a place of execution or burial or refers to something else.

"Calvary hill" today refers to a roughly life-size depiction of the scenes of the Passion of Christ, with sculptures of additional figures. These scenes are set up on the slopes of a hill. The traditional fourteen stations of the cross are usually laid out on the way up to the top of the pilgrimage hill and there is often a small, remote church or chapel located between a few dozen to several hundred metres away.

Calvary hills must not be confused with calvaries, which are a specific type of wayside monumental crucifix, a tradition mostly found in Brittany especially in the Finistère, built in parish closes between 1450 and the 17th century.

Calvaries in the world

Austria

Burgenland 
 Calvary Hill, Bergkirche in Eisenstadt
 Calvary Hill, Frauenkirchen
 Calvary Hill, Lockenhaus
 in Neusiedl am See
 in Pinkafeld

Carinthia 
 in Sankt Paul im Lavanttal
 in Sankt Stefan im Gailtal

Lower Austria 
 near the Aggsbach Charterhouse in Aggsbach, a village in the Wachau
 in Falkenstein in the wine quarter
 in Kirchberg am Wechsel
 in Lilienfeld, largest calvary hill in Austria
 in Marbach an der Donau
 in Maria-Lanzendorf near Vienna
 in Pillersdorf in the wine quarter
 Calvary Hill, Retz
 in Eggenburg
 in Zwettl

Upper Austria 
 Calvary Hill, Aigen in the Mühlkreis
 in Freistadt
 Calvary Hill, Gosau
 Calvary Hill, Kremsmünster
 in St. Martin im Innkreis
 in Schwertberg

Salzburg 
 Calvary Hill, Maria Bühel
 Calvary Hill, Maria Plain
 in Oberndorf bei Salzburg

Styria 
 Calvary Hill, (Bruck an der Mur)
 Calvary Hill, (Deutschfeistritz)
 Kalvarienberg (Graz)
 Calvary Hill, Leoben
 in Sankt Margarethen bei Knittelfeld
 Calvary Hill (Sankt Radegund bei Graz)
Calvary Hill, (Feldbach)

Tyrol 
 Calvary Hill Chapel, Arzl, in the Innsbruck quarter of Arzl
 in Kufstein
 Calvary Hill, Thaur

Vienna 
 in Hernals

Belarus 
 in Miadziel (a small town north of Minsk (Мядзел))
 in Minsk (Мінск)

Belgium 
 in Moresnet/Plombières
 in Malmedy

Bolivia 
 Cerro Calvario

Canada 
 The Oka Calvary Trail near Oka, Québec

Croatia 
 Calvary Hill near Aljmaš

Czech Republic

 in Jiřetín pod Jedlovou
 in Cvikov

Ethiopia
Lalibela

England

Mount St Bernard Abbey, Leicestershire.

Germany 
 (in alphabetical order by place)
 Calvary Hill, Ahrweiler (with Kalvarienberg Abbey), Ahrweiler, county of Ahrweiler, Rhineland-Palatinate
 Calvary Hill, Aiterbach, Aiterbach, county of Freising, Bavaria
 Calvary Hill Chapel, Altomünster
in Bad Kissingen
in Bad Neuenahr-Ahrweiler (as a school)
in Bad Laer
in Bad Tölz, Bad Tölz-Wolfratshausen, Bavaria
in Berchtesgaden
 Calvary Hill, Bergheim, Bergheim, Rhein-Erft-Kreis, North Rhine-Westphalia
in Bidingen, county of Ostallgäu
in Birkungen (Thuringia)
in Burladingen
in Cham (Upper Palatinate)
in Donauwörth
 Calvary Hill, Dorweiler, Dorweiler, county of Düren, North Rhine-Westphalia
in Ebnath in the Oberpfalz
in Falkenberg (Oberpfalz)
in Fichtelberg (Oberfranken)
in Fulda
in Füssen
 Calvary Hill, Greding, county of Roth, Bavaria
 Calvary Hill, Füssen, county of Ostallgäu, Bavaria
in Görlitz in the Heiligen-Grab-Ensemble
 Calvary Hill, Gundelsheim, Württemberg
in Immenstadt
near the Pilgrimage Church, Allerheiligen in Jettingen-Scheppach
in the pilgrimage village of Kinzweiler
 Calvary Hill, Kirchenthumbach, Kirchenthumbach, county of Neustadt an der Waldnaab, Bavaria
 (Klosterlechfeld see below)
 in Konnersreuth
 Calvary Hill, Lauterhofen, county of Neumarkt in the Oberpfalz, Bavaria
in Lenggries
in Lübeck (Jerusalemsberg)
in Marsberg
at Kreuzberg Abbey in the Rhön
 Calvary Hill, Neusath, county of Schwandorf, Bavaria
in Ostritz, Sachsen
at St. Marienthal Abbey
 Calvary Hill, Parsberg, county of Neumarkt in the Upper Palatinate, Bavaria
in Peiting in Upper Bavaria
in Pfreimd
in Pillig in Rhineland-Palatinate
in Pobenhausen and also in Palling, both in Upper Bavaria
in Possenhofen municipality of Pöcking on Lake Starnberg
in the Devil's Cave near Pottenstein
 Calvary Hill, Prüm, Eifelkreis Bitburg-Prüm, Rhineland-Palatinate
 Calvary Hill, Alendorf, in the municipality of Blankenheim
 Calvary Hill, Reicholzried
in Sichtigvor on the Loermund
in Stühlingen
 Calvary Hill, Schwabegg, county of Augsburg, Bavaria
in Sonthofen
in Straelen on the Lower Rhine
bei Wettenhausen in the municipality of Kammeltal
in Wenigmünchen (near Munich)
in Xanten am Niederrhein
in Zell in the Wiesental chapel on the Möhrenberg
the Calvary Hill at the pilgrimage site of Klosterlechfeld in Bavaria there is not stations of the cross path, but a monument with outside staircase.

Greece 
 on the hill of Filerimos on Rhodes

Hungary 
 Calvary Hill in Pécs

Italy
Sacri Monti of Piedmont and Lombardy
Sacro Monte di Varallo
Sacred Mount Calvary of Domodossola
San Vivaldo Monastery in Montaione
Sacro Monte di Orta
Sacro Monte di Varese
Sacro Monte di Crea
Sacro Monte di Ghiffa
Sacro Monte di Ossuccio
Sacro Monte di Oropa
Sacro Monte di Belmonte

Lithuania

Žemaičių Kalvarija
Kalvarija, Lithuania 
Verkiai Calvary

Poland

Kalwaria Zebrzydowska, near Kraków
Góra Kalwaria, near Warsaw
Wejherowo, near Gdańsk
Kalwaria Pacławska, near Przemyśl
Kalwaria Panewnicka, in Katowice
Pakość, near Inowrocław
Góra Świętej Anny, near Opole
Wambierzyce, near Kłodzko
Ujście, near Piła
Krzeszów, near Wałbrzych
Pszów, near Wodzisław Śląski
Bardo, near Kłodzko
Piekary Śląskie, near Bytom
Głotowo, near Olsztyn
Wiele, near Chojnice
Kodeń, near Biała Podlaska

Romania 
 in the village of Billed, county of Timiș

Slovakia
Kalvária Banská Štiavnica
Prešov
Spišský Jeruzalem
Bratislava - the oldest calvary in Hungarian kingdom
Marianka
Skalica
Rožňava
Nitra
Doľany, Pezinok District

Slovenia 
 in Šmarje pri Jelšah
 Kalvarija (Maribor)

Spain 
 in Poll ença

See also

blessed Alvarez of Córdoba
Christian Kruik van Adrichem
 Stations of the Cross

References

Literature 
German:
 
 
  – Philologische Studien und Quellen 2, 
 
 

French:
  – also in the Breton language
  – Mémoires de l'histoire
  – Les universels Gisserot 13,

External links 

 Documentation centre for Sacri Monti, calvary hills and European sites of commemoration
Elżbieta Bilska-Wodecka, European Calvaries: Analysis of Structures, Types and Origins
Sacri Monti: From Jerusalem to Sacred Mounts

Polish Calvaries: Architecture as a Stage for the Passion of Christ

Christianity in Jerusalem
Christian buildings and structures
Christian pilgrimages
Stations of the Cross

Baroque architecture
Medieval architecture
Renaissance architecture